Jackie Simpson may refer to:

 Jackie Simpson (linebacker) (1936–1983), American football linebacker
 Jackie Simpson (defensive back) (1934–2017), American football defensive back

See also
Jack Simpson (disambiguation)
John Simpson (disambiguation)